The 2008 North Carolina Attorney General election was held on November 4, 2008, concurrently with the other elections to the Council of State and the gubernatorial election. Incumbent Democratic State Attorney General Roy Cooper won re-election and received the highest number of votes for any statewide Democrat in this year.

Democratic primary

Candidates

Declared
 Roy Cooper, incumbent Attorney General

Republican primary

Candidates

Declared
 Bob Crumley

General election

Polling

Results

Footnotes

 
2008
North Carolina